Rishkhvar (also Romanized as Rīshkhvār; also known as Rīshkhār, Rushkhei, and Rūshkhī) is a village in Miankuh Rural District, Chapeshlu District, Dargaz County, Razavi Khorasan Province, Iran. At the 2006 census, its population was 406, in 94 families.

References 

Populated places in Dargaz County